Ballygunner GAA (nicknamed  "The Gunners") is a Gaelic Athletic Association (GAA) club located in the parish of St Mary's Ballygunner in Waterford City, Ireland.
The are the current All-Ireland Senior Club Hurling Championship title holders.

The club, which is exclusively concerned with hurling, is one of the most successful in Waterford. It has won 20 county titles and produced many great players for Waterford such as Paul Flynn, Fergal Hartley, Billy O'Sullivan and Pauric Mahony. Ballygunner has an intense rivalry with fellow city club Mount Sion and for many years in the 1990s and 2000s the two dominated the club scene. Since 1992, Ballygunner have won 17 county titles. The Munster Senior title was first won in 2001 with a victory over Cork side Blackrock (2-14 to 0-12). A second crown came in 2018, and a third in 2021–22. As of 2022 they have won 9 county titles in a row.

History 
Ballygunner GAA is a hurling club based in Ballygunner village, on the outskirts of Waterford city. The club was founded in 1954 by local schoolteacher Jimmy McGinn.

Prior to 1954, there was no adult hurling team in the parish. All hurlers who came out of the small national school travelled into Waterford city to play for either the Erin's Own club or now archrivals Mount Sion. McGinn believed that there was enough talent in the parish to compete with the powerhouses of Waterford hurling. Having enjoyed multiple success at under age level through the local national school, Mr Mc Ginn, as he was commonly called, set up the club to nurture the game in the small parish.

Mc Ginn's aspirations were correct. That very year, Ballygunner hurling club collected their first piece of a long line of silverware by winning the minor county championship. This was a more-than-promising start, for a club that would take Waterford hurling by storm.

The club holds Waterford Senior Hurling titles for the following years: 1966, 1967, 1968, 1992,1995, 1996, 1997, 1999, 2001, 2005, 2009, 2011 2014, 2015,2016, 2017, 2018, 2019 and 2020. They are one of the main powers in Waterford hurling, winning numerous underage titles and also regularly winning the senior title.

Hurling 
Ballygunner GAA concerns itself primarily with hurling. It passes both the camogie & Gaelic football duties to its sister club Gáil Tír.

Notable current players
Stephen O'Keeffe
Barry Coughlan
Philip Mahony
David O'Sullivan
Shane O'Sullivan
Barry O'Sullivan
Pauric Mahony
Brian O'Sullivan
Tim O'Sullivan
Dessie "the clutch" Hutch

The golden era (1954–1968) 
Following the Minor Championship success in 1954, Ballygunner's senior side had to start from the bottom & work their way up. In 1956, they reached the Junior County Final against Geraldines. Although they lost by 2-7, it did not dishearten the team. The following year they gained promotion into the senior ranks by winning the junior championship.

In 1963, Ballygunner faced Mount Sion for the first time in a Senior County Final. It was Ballygunner's first at this grade. Mount Sion won the match by 4-6 to 3-4. Again in 1965, Mount Sion ran out victorious to ensure a three in a row, but by only one point this time around. The tide was beginning to turn in Waterford hurling.

The 1st three in a row 
1966 was the historic year that Ballygunner first made the breakthrough. They defeated Mount Sion 2-6 to 2-3. Now that the main barrier was passed, McGinn set his ambitions to make Ballygunner a serious force in Waterford hurling. They defeated Ballyduff Lower/Portlaw & Mount Sion in '67 & '68 respectively to capture a first three in a row.

Relegation period (1980–1984) 
As the great team of the 60s had been trying for several to win a county title, they now faced a new problem. The three in a row winning team were aging rapidly and several key players began to retire.

Up until the '90s, Ballygunner village was very small and had a low population. This led to a lack of young people in the parish and thus a lack of juvenile players. Despite the best efforts of James McGinn, the same standard of under-age teams that had been developed in the club's early days could not be kept.

In 1980, the club was relegated to the intermediate grade. This was a massive blow to the club and parish in general. However, after failed attempts in 1982 and '83, Ballygunner earned promotion to the senior ranks yet again in 1984 after a four-year absence.

Knowing that he was getting on in age, McGinn had one more ace to play. In 1972, he began to sculpt an even greater team than that in the 60s. This team would guide the gunners to not just to the pinnacle of Waterford hurling again, but to the pinnacle of Munster hurling.

The glory days (1992-2001) 
In 1992, Ballygunner won their first county title since 1968. The team's backbone was the successful underage team that had won almost every underage honour that was in the county including back-to-back under-21 County titles in 1988-89. Billy O'Sullivan and Cian Cantwell captained the sides on each occasion. This team was the last team that James McGinn would train and great things were expected.

The average age of the team was under 23 years old. Notable player on the panel that day were, Billy O'Sullivan (23), Stephen Frampton (24), Fergal Hartley (20) & Paul Flynn (17)

During this great era for the club, James McGinn died in 1995. He had seen the club he loved reach the pinnacle of Waterford hurling.

The 2nd three in a row 
The Gunners were now the only Waterford team to win a third consecutive county title since they last did it back in 1966. In 1997, after a fiercely contested local derby, Fergal Hartly made his way up to the presentation area in Walsh Park to collect the county title for his third time after a 2-17 - 1-14 defeat of Passage.

Although unable to manage a four in a row, they returned the following year to rob Mount Sion of a two in a row. Paul Flynn finally was given the opportunity to lift the county title for himself.

2001 Munster Champions 

After Mount Sion defeated Ballygunner in the 2000 county final, it looked like the beginning of the end of a historical era for the club. However, there was still some fight left in the aging team.

After the gloom of the 2000 defeat, an AGM was held in the clubhouse in Ballygunner. At it, it was decided to elect Gordan Ryan as the new manager and the recently retired inter-county hurler Billy O'Sullivan as team captain. Ryan brought a brand new method of training to Ballygunner. Personnel training schedules were given to each player and almost weekly physical sessions were administered. This new found professionalism led to their first piece of silverware of the year in winning the County League. The next honour for the Gunners was the Sergent Cup. Both of these competitions were high profiled throughout the county of Waterford & a buzz began to creep around the parish & the county.

In 2001 Ballygunner beat Lismore GAA 4-12 to 1-16 to claim its 9th Waterford Senior Hurling Title. The proof that Ballygunner was not dead was clearly visible following several inspirational performances by such senior players as Billy and Rory O'Sullivan, Stephen Frampton & Ray Whitty as well as performances from younger players such as Andy Moloney and Alan Kirwan.

In the same year they enjoyed a very successful Munster Senior Club Hurling Championship beating St. Joseph's Doora-Barefield 2-19 to 2-13 and Toomevara 2-10 to 0-15 after a replay. Two decisive goals from Andy Moloney ensured that the Gunners would enter yet another Munster Club Final.

The final played in Semple Stadium Thurles was a closely fought game until the final minutes.
Having been off target from two scoreable chances, and with the deficit down to three points, Paul Flynn took control of the final in the last ten minutes. He pointed two frees, one of them from inside his own half, and then, with just two minutes left on the clock, he snapped up an Andy Moloney delivery and gave Blackrocks goalkeeper Trevor Barry no chance with a goal.
Flynn landed another point from a free to seal the Gunners victory. Ballygunner beat Blackrock of Cork 2-14 to 0-12. After 35 years of trying, Billy O'Sullivan finally lifted the holy grail of Munster Club Hurling on behalf of his much loved club.

Revival 
In the years that followed their Munster triumph, players such as Stephen Frampton & Mick Mahoney had retired from senior hurling & all that was left of the original under 21 team was Billy O'Sullivan. However a new batch of young players, fresh off a minor county title, came into the fray. Players such as Shane O'Sullivan & Wayne Hutchinson, were to cement their places on the senior squad.

Ballygunner beat De La Salle to win the 2005 Waterford Hurling Championship. This was a very important victory for the club as defeat would have meant their fourth straight loss in the County Final, having lost the previously three finals to Mount Sion.

The club later beat Garryspillane 2-12 to 1-11 and Clarecastle 3-13 to 2-9, Paul Flynn scoring a tally of 4-7 in those matches.
However Ballygunner later lost their sixth Munster Club Championship Final to Newtownshandrum of Cork despite a Man of the Match performance from Fergal Hartley.

8 in a row
Ballygunner claimed a fifth successive Waterford Senior Hurling Championship for the first time in their history on 7 October 2018 at Fraher Field with a scoreline of Ballygunner 2-18 Abbeyside 0-13 in front of a 4,275-strong crowd.

Pauric Mahony gave a man of the match display scoring 13 points (0-8f) and assisted by goals from Goals from Brian O’Sullivan and Conor Power the Gunners secured the win.

They have since gone on to win eight in a row by defeating Roanmore in the 2021 County final on 3 October.

Present 
Today, Ballygunner is one of the biggest clubs in Waterford. It caters for hundreds of juveniles from under 6 to under 16 & hundreds of adult hurlers from minor level to senior.

Ballygunner defeated Lismore after a replay to win the 2009 senior County Championship. They were narrowly defeated in the Munster final by Newtownshandrum for the second time in recent years. In 2011, they captured their 12th Senior County Title at the expense of Tallow.

Ballygunner defeated arch-rivals Mount Sion in the 2014 Waterford Senior Club Hurling Championship final on a scoreline of 2-16 to 0-9 points in Walsh Park.

Development 
In 1994, Ballygunner GAA finally acquired a permanent playing field beside the new national school. In 1996, a two-storey clubhouse was built with two dressing rooms, toilets, a referees' changing room and a small canteen.

After 2001, it was realised that to cope with the huge influx of young juveniles, and to provide adequate facilities, a great deal of time and money would have to be invested. Under chairman Pat O'Sullivan, a development plan was put into place. Phase 1 of the project involved extending of the clubhouse which would include two new dressing rooms and a meeting/trophy room. Next was the purchasing of  adjoining the current site. On this site, plans were put down for a new top-quality floodlit all-weather pitch, a hurling and handball ally, a floodlit AstroTurf and a state-of-the-art indoor hurling arena with new clubhouse facilities. For the club's 50th anniversary in 2004, the hurling ally and all-weather pitch were finished. Fencing was erected around the new field and a scoreboard was put in place for the day. Then president of the GAA, Sean Kelly, officially opened the new facilities.

Another phase of development was started in 2006. An AstroTurf was to be built between the old and new pitches. Towards the end of that year, the astroturf was completed. Then construction on the largest and most expensive project ever undertaken by a Waterford club could begin.

At a cost of approx. €1.5 million, the indoor arena would be built across from the AstroTurf. Construction began in the summer of 2008. At the current time, the main structure has been built, the astro turf floor has been laid and construction is close to completion on the adjoining pavilion.

Squads

2001 Munster Senior Club Hurling winning squad 

The following is the team that lined out for Ballygunner in the Munster Senior Club Hurling Championship final on 2 December 2001

2005 Munster Senior Club Hurling Squad 

The following is the team that lined out for Ballygunner in the Munster Senior Club Hurling Championship final on 4 December 2005:

2009 Munster Senior Club Hurling squad 

The following is the team that lined out for Ballygunner in the Munster Senior Club Hurling Championship final on 29 November 2009:

2018 Munster Senior Club Hurling winning squad 

The following is the team that lined out for Ballygunner in the Munster Senior Club Hurling Championship final on 18 November 2018:

Manager history

Captain history

Hurling titles

 All-Ireland Senior Club Hurling Championships: 1
 2022
 Munster Senior Club Hurling Championships: 4
 2001, 2018, 2021, 2022
 Waterford Senior Hurling Championships: 21
 1966, 1967, 1968, 1992, 1995, 1996, 1997, 1999, 2001, 2005, 2009, 2011, 2014, 2015, 2016, 2017, 2018, 2019, 2020, 2021, 2022
 Waterford Intermediate Hurling Championships: 2
 1984, 2022
 Waterford Junior Hurling Championships: 3
 1957, 1996 & 2013
 Waterford Under-21 Hurling Championships: 8
 1988, 1989, 2007, 2009, 2010, 2011, 2012 & 2014
 Waterford Minor Hurling Championships: 12
 1954, 1992, 2002, 2006, 2007, 2009, 2010, 2015, 2017,2018,2019,2020

All-Stars

Notable players 
 Barry Coughlan
 Paul Flynn
 Stephen Frampton
 Fergal Hartley
 Dessie Hutchinson
 Wayne Hutchinson
 Billy O'Sullivan
 Shane O'Sullivan
 Stephen O'Keeffe
 Pauric Mahony

References

External links 
 Waterford GAA site
 Waterford GAA club sites
 Waterford on Hoganstand.com
 senior hurling championship

Gaelic games clubs in County Waterford
Hurling clubs in County Waterford